The Ansaldo was an Italian automobile manufactured by the armaments concern Gio. Ansaldo & C. from 1921 to 1931. The company entered car manufacture with an OHC  inline-four engine model which could develop  at 3600 rpm. A sports version with   engine was offered, as was a six-cylinder version of 1991 cc; later six-cylinders were offered with engines of 2179 cc.

Ansaldos were generally of good quality and modern design, and competed in many races. When Wikov began manufacture in Czechoslovakia in 1928, they built the  Ansaldo Tipo 10.

Vintage vehicles
Defunct motor vehicle manufacturers of Italy
Gio. Ansaldo & C.